Peeter Lorents (born 25 September 1951 Pärnu) is an Estonian mathematician and politician. He was a member of VII Riigikogu.

References

Living people
1951 births
Members of the Riigikogu, 1992–1995
Members of the Riigikogu, 1995–1999
Estonian mathematicians